Sir Roland Evelyn Turnbull  (9 June 1905 – 23 December 1960) was a British colonial official and governor of British North Borneo. His major influence is mentoring Brunei's former ruler, Sultan Omar Ali Saifuddien III. He stated that in 1959 to one of his Colonial Office colleagues that the Sultan came to regard him as ‘his father’.

Biography
Turnbull was the son of George Turnbull.  He attended King's College London and St John's College, Oxford.

Career

1920s and 1930s
In 1929 Turnbull joined the British Colonial Service as a cadet and was first attached to the District Office at Tampin in Malaya.  In 1931 he went to Terengganu as Collector of Land Revenue.  In 1933 he became assistant secretary to the High Commissioner in Malaya.  In 1934 he was appointed British Resident in Brunei where he remained until going on leave in 1936.  From 1937 to 1940 he was attached to the Colonial Secretariat.

1940s
From 1940 to 1943 Turnbull was Colonial Secretary in the British Honduras.  During the war from 1943 to 1945 he was employed in the Ministry of Defence. Following the war he was Colonial Secretary in Cyprus until 1950.  On 9 September 1948, he married Sylvia Emily Woodman Burbidge, a daughter of Sir Richard Woodman Burbidge, 2nd of the Burbidge baronets.

1950s
From 1950 to 1953 Turnbull was based in Cape Town while serving as the Chief Secretary and Deputy High Commissioner for Basutoland, Bechuanaland and Swaziland (BBS).  

In his final position he was based in Jesselton as the penultimate Governor of North Borneo from 4 March 1954 until 1959. 

It was during this time that he appointed Keith Wookey as Resident in 1956 to Sandakan, North Borneo.

Honours
Turnbull was invested in 1956 as a Knight Commander in the Order of St Michael and St George.

References

1905 births
1960 deaths
Knights Commander of the Order of St Michael and St George
Governors of North Borneo
British colonial governors and administrators in the Americas
British Honduras people
Administrators in British Brunei
British colonial governors and administrators in Europe
British Cyprus people
British colonial governors and administrators in Africa
Basutoland people
Bechuanaland Protectorate people